Hispanoamérica is an administrative neighborhood of Madrid belonging to the district of Chamartín.

As of 1 March 2020, it has a population of 32,181.

Several of the placenames in the neighborhood make a reference to locations in Hispanic America, including the plazas of Cuzco, Lima, Ecuador, República Dominicana and Perú, and the streets of Veracruz, Valparaíso, Oruro, Cochabamba, Potosí, Colombia, Uruguay, Nicaragua, Costa Rica, Puerto Rico and Chile.

References 
Citations

Bibliography
 

Wards of Madrid
Chamartín (Madrid)